Choi Jin-young (November 17, 1970 – March 29, 2010) was a South Korean actor and singer.

Career
Choi made his debut as a television commercial model in 1987 and began his acting career three years later. He rose to stardom in 1993 with the popular TV show Our Paradise, and his resemblance to his elder sister, popular actress Choi Jin-sil gave him a head start in his career, while his youthful image helped him gain recognition in various TV dramas, commercials and even films. Choi's acting career floundered but in 1999, after completing military service, he returned to the stage as a singer using the stage name SKY. His first album Final Fantasy was a success, with the popular single "Forever" topping music charts. He released his third and last album in 2004. In 2007, he returned to acting with a supporting role in the series It's OK Because I Love You, but failed to catch much attention.

Personal life 
When Choi Jin-sil committed suicide on October 2, 2008, photos of Choi in tears clutching his sister's picture shook the nation, and fans wept with him as he led her funeral procession. Acting upon his late sister's wishes to finish college, he belatedly enrolled in Hanyang University to study acting in 2009, and played Demetrius in a staging of Shakespeare's A Midsummer Night's Dream.

Suffering from depression after his sister's death, Choi canceled engagements for more than a year. Friends later said he made several suicide attempts and had his stomach pumped for a drug overdose in 2009. Refusing his mother's pleas that he see a doctor, Choi relied instead on nonprescription tranquilizers he bought from a pharmacy. In January 2010, Choi signed with a new agency, MCloud Entertainment, and announced plans on March 2 to resume activities in the first half of the year, but his approaching comeback added to his stress and he increasingly felt frustrated that he wasn't getting cast in any TV series.

Death 
On March 29, 2010, Choi hanged himself with an electrical cord in the attic of his apartment in Nonhyeon-dong, Seoul. When Choi did not answer the phone, Chung alerted Choi's mother, and the two hurried to his home together. His body was found by his mother and a woman identified as Chung, who was his junior in college. They called the police and a 119 rescue squad around 2:14 pm. Choi was rushed to Gangnam Severance Hospital for CPR at 2:46 p.m. but was pronounced dead on arrival.

Choi's body was cremated and buried next to his sister at the Kapsan Cemetery in Yangpyeong, Gyeonggi Province.

Filmography

Television series
92 고래사냥 (KBS2, 1992)
Our Paradise 2 (MBC, 1993)
Landscaping with My Wife (KBS2, 1996)
도시남녀 (SBS, 1996)
Power of Love (MBC, 1996)
방울이 (MBC, 1997)
It's OK Because I Love You (KBS2, 2007)

Film
Well, Let's Look at the Sky Sometimes (1990)
You Know What? It's a Secret 2 (1991)
Does the American Moon Rise Over Itaewon? (1991)
Beyond the Mountain (1991)
Teenage Love Song (1991)
I Want to Live Just Until 20 Years Old (1992)
멀고 먼 해후 (1995)
Final Blow (1996)
젊음의 문을 열고 (1996)

Theater
A Midsummer Night's Dream (2009)

Discography

Awards
1991 Chunsa Film Art Awards: Best New Actor (Beyond the Mountain)
1999 SBS Gayo Daejeon: Rock Award
2000 Mnet Asian Music Awards: Best New Male Artist
2000 대한민국 영상음반대상: Best Newcomer
2000 Golden Disk Awards: Best Newcomer

References

External links
 
 
 

Male actors from Seoul
Suicides by hanging in South Korea
South Korean male singers
South Korean pop rock singers
South Korean male film actors
South Korean male television actors
1970 births
2010 deaths
Jin-young
MAMA Award winners
2010 suicides